Cultus Lake may refer to:

Cultus Lake, British Columbia, Canada
Cultus Lake (Oregon), United States
Little Cultus Lake, Oregon, United States